The NSU Sharks Men's Basketball team represents Nova Southeastern University in Davie, Florida. They currently compete in the Sunshine State Conference.

History
The 2007–08 Nova Southeastern University men’s basketball team posted a 10–18 overall record and a 5–11 Sunshine State Conference mark, but the short-handed Sharks played with heart and battled despite being saddled with multiple injuries. The Sharks, who played the entire season without forwards Dionte Perry and David Naylor due to injury, were also without the services of Kevin Chester, Josh Wood, Ross Allsop and Lemar Dyer for games throughout the season.

NSU played a top notch non-conference schedule even though they play in the highly competitive SSC. The Sharks squared off against five NCAA Tournament teams, including South Region Tournament host and SSC Champion Florida Southern three times. Showing that they were up to the challenge, NSU defeated FSC once and dropped a tough overtime decision to the Moccasins in their three match-ups.

The Sharks started the season with two losses on the road to NCAA Tournament teams, Alabama-Huntsville and North Alabama. Remaining on the road, NSU
captured back-to-back victories over West Florida and Palm Beach Atlantic before coming home and winning three consecutive games, including their win over Florida Southern.

Hit by the injury bug, the Sharks would drop six of their next seven games. NSU then pulled off a 77–76 SSC victory over Saint Leo on the road. Seemingly on the right track, NSU won two of their next three SSC games before an 85–83 overtime loss to Florida Southern sent the Sharks into a tailspin.

From that point on, multiple injuries to key players led to inconsistencies, as the Sharks would struggle to put together a complete line-up on the
court. NSU managed to re-group after five consecutive losses to defeat SSC defending champs Rollins in a 95–94 double overtime thriller, but couldn’t carry the momentum over in its final three games.

A 78–58 loss to eventual conference champion Florida Southern in the SSC Tournament ended the Sharks’ season at 10–18, including a 5–11 record in the Sunshine State Conference.

As a result of his play during the season, junior Tim Coenraad garnered several postseason honors. He was selected to the All-Region First Team by the National Association of Basketball Coaches. He also received Second-Team All-SSC and Daktronics All-Region nods. Additionally, his work in the classroom paid off as he was named to the CoSIDA/ESPN the Magazine Academic All-District Second Team.

The Sharks bid farewell to three seniors – guards Jason Del Calvo and Oresti Nitsios and center Chester.

Del Calvo, a four year player, saw action in 47 games in his career at NSU. He averaged 1.1 points per game. He scored a career high 11 points as a junior in the Sharks’ season-opener vs. Alabama Huntsville.

Nitsios, also a four year player, played in 109 games in his Sharks career. As a senior, he played in 27 games, receiving 16 starts, averaging
7.3 points per game. He averaged a career-high 9.3 points per game as a sophomore in 2005–06.

Chester, a transfer from Division I’s Campbell, played three years at NSU. He averaged 13.5 points and 6.8 rebounds per game in his senior campaign. Kevin scored more than 20 points in six of his last seven games in 2007–08. He ti ed the NSU single-game scoring record with a 39-point eff ort against Rollins on Feb. 20. Chester finished his career sixth in NSU history with 457 total rebounds.

Season by season results

References